Among animals which produce eggs, the yolk (also known as the vitellus) is the nutrient-bearing portion of the egg whose primary function is to supply food for the development of the embryo.  Some types of egg contain no yolk, for example because they are laid in situations where the food supply is sufficient (such as in the body of the host of a parasitoid) or because the embryo develops in the parent's body, which supplies the food, usually through a placenta.  Reproductive systems in which the mother's body supplies the embryo directly are said to be matrotrophic; those in which the embryo is supplied by yolk are said to be lecithotrophic.  In many species, such as all birds, and most reptiles and insects, the yolk takes the form of a special storage organ constructed in the reproductive tract of the mother.  In many other animals, especially very small species such as some fish and invertebrates, the yolk material is not in a special organ, but inside the egg cell. 

As stored food, yolks are often rich in vitamins, minerals, lipids and proteins.  The proteins function partly as food in their own right, and partly in regulating the storage and supply of the other nutrients.  For example, in some species the amount of yolk in an egg cell affects the developmental processes that follow fertilization.

The yolk is not living cell material like protoplasm, but largely passive material, that is to say deutoplasm.  The food material and associated control structures are supplied during oogenesis.  Some of the material is stored more or less in the form in which the maternal body supplied it, partly as processed by dedicated non-germ tissues in the egg, while part of the biosynthetic processing into its final form happens in the oocyte itself.

Apart from animals, other organisms, like algae, especially in the oogamous, can also accumulate resources in their female gametes.  In gymnosperms, the remains of the female gametophyte serve also as food supply, and in flowering plants, the endosperm.

Chicken egg yolk 
In avian eggs, the yolk usually is a hue of yellow in color. It is spherical and is suspended in the egg white (known alternatively as albumen or glair/glair) by one or two spiral bands of tissue called the chalazae.

The yolk mass, together with the ovum proper (after fertilization, the embryo) are enclosed by the vitelline membrane, whose structure is different from a cell membrane.  The yolk is mostly extracellular to the oolemma, being not accumulated inside the cytoplasm of the egg cell (as occurs in frogs), contrary to the claim that the avian ovum (in strict sense) and its yolk are a single giant cell.

After the fertilization, the cleavage of the embryo leads to the formation of the germinal disc.

As food, the chicken egg yolk is a major source of vitamins and minerals.  It contains all of the egg's fat and cholesterol, and nearly half of the protein.
If left intact when an egg is fried, the yellow yolk surrounded by a flat blob of egg white creates a distinctive "sunny-side up" form. Mixing the two components together before cooking results in a yellow (from pale yellow to almost orange, depending on the breed of hen) mass, as in omelets and scrambled eggs.

Uses 
 The developing embryo inside the egg uses the yolk as sustenance.
 It is at times separated from the egg white for cooking, and is frequently employed as an emulsifier, and is used in mayonnaise, custard, hollandaise sauce, crème brûlée, avgolemono and ovos moles.
 It is used in painting as a component of traditional egg-tempera.
 It is used in the production of egg yolk agar plate medium, useful in testing for the presence of Clostridium perfringens.
 Egg yolk contains an antibody called antiglobulin (IgY).  The antibody transfers from the laying hen to the egg yolk by passive immunity to protect both embryo and hatchling from microorganism invasion.
 Egg yolk can be used to make liqueurs such as Advocaat or eggnog.
 Egg yolk is used to extract egg oil which has various cosmetic, nutritional, and medicinal uses.

Composition of chicken egg yolk 

All of the fat-soluble vitamins (A, D, E and K) are found in the egg yolk.  Egg yolk is one of the few foods naturally containing vitamin D.

The composition (by weight) of the most prevalent fatty acids in egg yolk typically is:
 Unsaturated fatty acids:
 Oleic acid, 47%
 Linoleic acid, 16%
 Palmitoleic acid, 5%
 Linolenic acid, 2%
 Saturated fatty acids:
 Palmitic acid, 23%
 Stearic acid, 4%
 Myristic acid, 1%

Egg yolk is a source of lecithin, as well as egg oil, for cosmetic and pharmaceutical applications. Based on weight, egg yolk contains about 9% lecithin.

The yellow color is due to lutein and zeaxanthin, which are yellow or orange carotenoids known as xanthophylls.

Yolk proteins 
The different yolk's proteins have distinct roles. Phosvitins are important in sequestering calcium, iron, and other cations for the developing embryo. Phosvitins are one of the most phosphorylated (10%) proteins in nature; the high concentration of phosphate groups provides efficient metal-binding sites in clusters. Lipovitellins are involved in lipid and metal storage, and contain a heterogeneous mixture of about 16% (w/w) noncovalently bound lipid, most being phospholipid. Lipovitellin-1 contains two chains, LV1N and LV1C.

Yolk vitamins and minerals 
Yolks hold more than 90% of the calcium, iron, phosphorus, zinc, thiamine, vitamin B6, folate, vitamin B12, and pantothenic acid of the egg. In addition, yolks cover all of the fat-soluble vitamins: A, D, E, and K in the egg, as well as all of the essential fatty acids.

A single yolk from a large egg contains roughly 22 mg of calcium, 66 mg of phosphorus, 9.5 micrograms of selenium, and 19 mg of potassium, according to the USDA.

Double-yolk eggs 

Double-yolk eggs occur when ovulation occurs too rapidly, or when one yolk becomes joined with another yolk. These eggs may be the result of a young hen's reproductive cycle not yet being synchronized.

The average probability of finding this is 1 in 1200.

Double-yolked eggs seldom lead to successful hatchlings without human intervention, as the chicks interfere with each other's hatching process and do not survive.

Higher-order yolks are rare, though hens are known to occasionally lay even triple-yolk eggs.

Yolkless eggs 

Eggs without yolks are known as "dwarf" or "wind" eggs, or the archaic term "cock egg". Such an egg is most often a pullet's first effort, produced before her laying mechanism is fully ready. Mature hens rarely lay a yolkless egg, but sometimes a piece of reproductive tissue breaks away and passes down the tube. Such a scrap of tissue may stimulate the egg-producing glands to react as though it were a yolk and wrap it in albumen, membranes, and a shell as it travels through the egg tube. This is usually what causes an egg to contain a small particle of grayish tissue instead of a yolk.

Since these eggs contain no yolk, and therefore cannot hatch, they were traditionally believed to have been laid by roosters. This type of egg occurs in many varieties of fowl and has been found in chickens, both standard and bantams, guineas, and coturnix quail.

Yolk color 

The color of an egg yolk is directly influenced by the makeup of the chicken feed. Egg yolk color is generally more yellow when given a feed containing a large component of yellow, fat-soluble pigments, such as the carotenes in dark green plant material, for example alfalfa. Although much emphasis is put onto the color of the egg yolk, it does not reliably reflect the nutritional value of an egg. For example, some of the natural pigments that produce a rich yolk color are xanthophylls without much nutritional value, rather than the carotenoids that act as provitamin A in the body. Also, a diet rich in vitamin A itself, but without A-provitamins or xanthophylls, can produce practically colourless yolks that are just as nutritious as any richly colored yolks.

Yolks, particularly from free-range eggs, can be of a wide range of colors, ranging from nearly white, through yellow and orange, to practically red, or even olive green, depending on the pigments in their feed. Feeding fowl large amounts of capsicum peppers, for example, tends to result in red or deep orange yolks. This has nothing to do with adding colors such as cochineal to eggs in cooking.

In fish
All bony fish, some sharks and rays have yolk sacs at some stage of development, with all oviparous fish retaining the sac after hatching. Lamniform sharks are ovoviviparous, in that their eggs hatch in utero; in addition to eating unfertilized eggs, unborn sharks participate in intrauterine-cannibalism: stronger pups consume their weaker womb-mates.

See also
 Vitellogenesis

References

External links 

 Anatomy of an Egg from the Exploratorium
 Making egg tempera from the Society of Tempera Painters

Eggs